Go is a 2007 Bollywood film starring Gautam Gupta, Priyanka Kothari and Kay Kay Menon in the lead roles. It is directed by Manish Srivastav and produced by Ram Gopal Varma.

Synopsis
Abhay (Gautam Gupta) and Vasundhara (Priyanka Kothari) are neighbors who are in love. Due to strong opposition from their parents, they decide to elope to Goa. Meanwhile, Chief Minister Arjun Patil (Ravi Kale) has his Deputy Chief Minister Praveen Deshpande (Govind Namdeo) murdered, planning of which is audio-taped by his assistant Bihari. Bihari then decides to blackmail the Chief Minister (CM), whose men eventually kill Bihari but not before he drops the tape in Abhay and Vasundhara's car. This leads to the couple being chased by CM's goons and Inspector Nagesh Rao (Kay Kay Menon), who wants to get hold of the tape in order to exhort money from the CM.

Cast
 Gautam Gupta as Abhay Narula
 Priyanka Kothari as Vasundhara 'Vasu' Dave
 Kay Kay Menon as Nagesh Rao
 Rajpal Yadav as Kay Jagtap Tiwari
 Priyanka Sharma as Sanjana Joshi
 Ravi Kale as Chief Minister Arjun Patil
 Shereveer Vakil as T. S. 'Ranga' Ranganathan
 Govind Namdeo as Deputy Chief Minister Praveen Deshpande
 Ravi Bhatia as Veer baji singh
 Aamir Iqbal Sial as Aamri Sir
 Shazad Latif as Man

Soundtrack 

 Go - Kunal Ganjawala, Meenal Jain, Suzanne D'Mello  and Shaan
 So Cool - Kunal Ganjawala and Suzanne D'Mello
 Oooh - Vinod Rathod and Sunidhi Chauhan
 Kaash - Farhad Bhiwandiwala and Priyadarshini
 Kaash (Remix) - Farhad Bhiwandiwala and Priyadarshini
 Dhan Tan Tan (Remix) - Kunal Ganjawala and Sneha Khanwalkar
 Dhan Tan Tan - Kunal Ganjawala and Sneha Khanwalkar
 Oooh (Remix) - Vinod Rathod and Sunidhi Chauhan

References

External links
 

2007 films
Films scored by Sneha Khanwalkar
2000s Hindi-language films